Scammell is a surname. Notable people with the surname include:

Alexander Scammell (1742–1781), officer in the Continental Army during the American Revolutionary War
Arthur Scammell (1913–1995), Newfoundland and Labrador writer
Jack Henry Scammell (1894–1940), Newfoundland educator, journalist and politician
Michael Scammell (born 1935), English author, biographer and translator of Slavic literature
Pat Scammell (born 1961), Australian runner
Roy Scammell (1932–2021), British stunt actor
Terrence Scammell (British actor), born 1937
Terrence Scammell (Canadian actor), born 1958
Vanessa Scammell, Australian pianist and conductor
William Scammell (1939–2000), British poet

See also
 Walter Scammel (died 1286), Bishop of Salisbury